Kings Park, Western Australia is a mixture of approximately one-third grassed parkland and botanical gardens, and two-thirds native bushland. Several streets provide vehicular access to the grassed area and gardens, and a network of pedestrian and shared use paths go through the bushland.

Kings Park is bounded by:
 Kings Park Road to the north
 Thomas Street to the north-west
 Winthrop Avenue to the west
 Mounts Bay Road to the south
 Mounts Bay Road (approximately), Bellevue Terrace, Cliff Street to the west

See also

References 

Kings Park
Kings Park
Kings Park, Western Australia
Kings Park streets
Kings Park